Barry Duke (born 1 February 1947 in Johannesburg) is a journalist, atheist, gay rights activist,  former editor of The Freethinker and current editor of The Pink Humanist and The Angry Atheist.

Life and career
Born in apartheid South Africa, Duke began writing as a trainee journalist in his teens for The Springs Advertiser in 1964. After completing a course in photojournalism in 1967, he moved to The Star (South Africa) newspaper in Johannesburg working as an investigative journalist and The Star's chief court reporter. In 1973, Duke moved to the UK, where he continued to write anti-apartheid pieces for Argus Newspapers (now Independent News and Media).
In 1974 Duke joined publishing company Broadstrood Press whilst beginning to write regularly for The Freethinker. Leaving publishing in 1980, Duke began working as a public relations executive for British Transport Hotels. When the company was privatized, Duke left in 1983 to work for Citigate Publishing and pursue freelance work. In 1996, Duke left Citigate to look after a terminally ill partner, but continued to write freelance. In 1997, Duke took over as the interim editor of The Freethinker, following the death of previous editor Peter Brearey. After six months, Duke was confirmed as the editor. Duke was summarily sacked at the beginning of January 2022.
In 2011, Duke took on the additional role of editor of The Pink Humanist, published by the Pink Triangle Trust.  In 2023, Duke launched "The Angry Atheist" blog.

Activism
Duke was involved in the Anti-Apartheid Movement and on arriving in the UK as a refugee from South Africa continued supporting the African National Congress.

Duke strongly opposed the Nationwide Festival of Light, and worked alongside The Freethinker and National Secular Society to try to counter its effects and influence. In 1979, Duke was a founding member of the Gay Humanist Group, (now Gay and Lesbian Humanist Association) after Mary Whitehouse began a private prosecution for blasphemous libel against Gay News (see Whitehouse v Lemon.) After the founding of the Gay Humanist Group, Duke was very active in the promotion of gay and atheist rights and was also briefly the treasurer of the National Secular Society (NSS).

In 2010 he relocated to Spain and in 2017 was awarded a Lifetime Achievement Award by the NSS.  In the same year he was married to his partner of 20 years, Marcus Oliver Robinson, in Gibraltar. He once wrote a weekly column for Euro Weekly News, an English paper published in Spain.

References

External links
 Freethinker Magazine
 Pink Humanist Magazine

1947 births
Living people
South African LGBT journalists
South African LGBT rights activists
South African atheists
South African journalists
21st-century South African LGBT people